Streptomyces sundarbansensis is a bacterium species from the genus of Streptomyces which has been isolated from soil from a mangrove forest from the Lothian Island in India. Streptomyces sundarbansensis produces 2-allyloxyphenol.

See also 
 List of Streptomyces species

References

Further reading

External links
Type strain of Streptomyces sundarbansensis at BacDive -  the Bacterial Diversity Metadatabase

sundarbansensis
Bacteria described in 2011